The Football Association of Bosnia and Herzegovina (Nogometni/Fudbalski Savez Bosne i Hercegovine (N/FSBiH); Ногометни/Фудбалски Савез Босне и Херцеговине (Н/ФСБиХ), (FSBiH); unified abbreviation N/FSBiH), based in Sarajevo, is the chief officiating body of football in Bosnia and Herzegovina. The Bosnian football association was founded as the Sarajevo football sub-association of Yugoslavia in 1920. In 1992 the association was re-founded as the football association of Bosnia and Herzegovina.

In May 2002, Football Federation of Bosnia and Herzegovina was unified to include both Bosnian regional football associations, the Football Association of Republika Srpska, and the already unified Football Association of Bosnia and Herzegovina with the Football Federation of Herzeg-Bosnia. In April 2011, it changed its name from Football Federation of Bosnia and Herzegovina to Football Association of Bosnia and Herzegovina.

History

Pre-independence (1903–1992)
The game reached Bosnia and Herzegovina at the start of the 20th century, with Sarajevo (in 1903) and Mostar (in 1905) being the first cities to embrace it. Banja Luka, Tuzla, Zenica and Bihać were next along with numerous smaller towns as the sport spread. The country was under Austro-Hungarian rule when official competition began in 1908, though these activities were on a small scale within each territory. At the outbreak of World War I, there were five clubs in Sarajevo, four based on religious and ethnic affiliation: SAŠK as Bosnian Croatian,  Slavija affiliated to Bosnian Serbs,  Bosniaks Đerzelez (also known as Sarajevski) and Makabi Sarajevo (also known as Barkohba) as Bosnian Jewish club; while only multi-ethnic was worker's club RŠD Hajduk. Along with Sarajevo-based clubs there were approximately 20 outside the capital. The creation of the Kingdom of Yugoslavia post 1918 brought an increase in the number of leagues, and soon a domestic national championship was organised featuring two teams from Bosnia and Herzegovina, the champions of Banja Luka Football Subassociation and Sarajevo Football Subassociation. In 1920, the direct predecessor of the football association of Bosnia-Herzegovina was founded as the Sarajevo football subassociation. The unified championship ran until 1939/40.

The Football Association of Bosnia and Herzegovina was founded after the Second World War, being affiliated to the Yugoslav Football Association.

Bosnia and Herzegovina's best sides at the time were FK Sarajevo, FK Željezničar (Sarajevo), FK Velež (Mostar), FK Sloboda (Tuzla), NK Čelik (Zenica) and FK Borac (Banja Luka) which played in the Yugoslavian first league, second league and cup competitions with moderate to good success, while its best players with the likes of Predrag Pašić, Vahid Halilhodžić, Davor Jozić, Safet Sušić, Josip Katalinski, Faruk Hadžibegić, Ivica Osim, Asim Ferhatović, Blaž Slišković, Mehmed Baždarević, Dušan Bajević, Edhem Šljivo, Enver Marić and many others were chosen to represent SFR Yugoslavia national football team.

Post-independence (1992–present)

During the season 1997–98 Bosnia-Herzegovina football league competition included both Bosniak and Bosnian Croat clubs playing against each other for the first time. Before this, the leagues ran strictly divided along ethnic lines. Bosnian Serb clubs joined the league system in 2002.

Premier League unification (May 2002)
In May, 2002, Football Association of Bosnia and Herzegovina was unified to include both Bosnian entity football associations, the Federation of Bosnia and Herzegovina Football Association, based in Sarajevo, and Republika Srpska Football Association, based in Banja Luka. The unified Premier League of Bosnia and Herzegovina that includes clubs from both entities started from the 2002-03 season and is active today. Each semi-autonomous half also has a federation of its own. source

FIFA suspends Bosnian FA

On April 1, 2011 UEFA and FIFA announced the suspension of the Football Association of Bosnia and Herzegovina with immediate effect. UEFA and FIFA decided to do so because the Association didn't follow the new UEFA statute, namely the rule under which the organization must be led by a single president. They had three, one for each one of the constituent national ethnicities:Bosniaks, Bosnian Serbs and Bosnian Croats, as was the case with the Dayton Agreement. The suspension was lifted on 30 May 2011 after the new statute was unanimously approved by all three ethnic groups. Suspension lasted for 2 months.

In the past years, some Bosnian players were very vocal about their opposition to then-leaders in the Bosnian FA, who were elected or appointed because of ethnic affiliation rather than professional qualifications. Fans often either boycotted the games or displayed anti-FA banners at the games they did attend. 13 Bosnian national team players (Misimović, Berberović, Grujić, Bartolović, Hrgović, Bajramović, Papac, Spahić, Milenković, Grlić, Bešlija, Hasagić, and Tolja) released a statement published in Dnevni Avaz daily, announcing they would boycott all national team matches until four FA officials – Milan Jelić, Iljo Dominković, Sulejman Čolaković, and Ahmet Pašalić – resigned. "We will no longer accept call-ups to the national team while these people are performing these functions, hoping that our gesture will mark the first step in the healing of this cancer in our soccer and a new beginning for the national team for which our hearts beat." in the letter it was quoted. A new team had to be assembled to continue qualifications for Euro 2008. Former forwards Sergej Barbarez and Elvir Bolić were the most vocal against the corruption in the Bosnian FA appearing on numerous TV shows expressing their deep frustration about the situation in the Bosnian football over the years.

FIFA imposes normalisation committee (April 2011 – December 2012)

From April 1, 2011, to December 2012, NSBiH was run by an FIFA-imposed normalisation committee with football great Ivica Osim at the head, which helped lift the FIFA imposed suspension of Bosnian football.

Other members of the Normalisation Committee include former football players and managers: Faruk Hadžibegić, Dušan Bajević, Sergej Barbarez and Jasmin Baković. According to many football enthusiasts, this was a welcome change for the football in the country. One of those dissmised from their positions was a former NSBiH secretary general Munib Ušanović, who was successfully prosecuted over tax evasion and illegal misappropriation of the NFSBiH funds. Together with Miodrag Kureš, Munib Ušanović has been sentenced to five years in jail over tax fraud.

Elvedin Begić elected first single president (December 2012)
On December 13, 2012, members of Football Association of Bosnia and Herzegovina voted in Elvedin Begić as the new first single president of the BiH football organization for the next four years. Mr Begić was serving as vice president to Normalisation Committee prior to this position.

UEFA President opens sport centre in Zenica (September 2013)
On September 2, 2013, UEFA President Michel Platini opened the Bosnia and Herzegovina Football Association new state of the art training centre, built with UEFA, FIFA and city of Zenica funding. Alongside of Michel Platini and Bosnian FA president Elvedin Begić, other special guests from the region included president of the Croatian Football Federation Davor Šuker, and Football Association of Serbia general secretary Zoran Laković. Also joining them were Ivica Osim, Jasmin Baković, Rodoljub Petković and at the time Bosnia-Herzegovina team coaches Safet Sušić and Borče Sredojević, as well as past team captain Emir Spahić, Senad Lulić, as well as Vlado Jagodić (coach of U21 Bosnia side at the time), former Bosnia players Muhamed Konjić, Elvir Bolić, Vedin Musić, and many others.

Football academy in Mostar (January 2015)
On January 20, 2015, Project dubbed "Projekat obnove sportskog centra u Mostaru za pomirenje u zajednici kroz promociju sporta" was announced meaning SKC Kantarevac in Mostar will be built and serve as the city's new football academy sponsored by Japanese embassy and Tsuneyasu Miyamoto and supported locally by Ivica Osim, former Japan national football team manager.

Vico Zeljković elected president (March 2021)
On 16 March 2021, Vico Zeljković, president of the Football Association of Republika Srpska, was elected president of the Bosnia and Herzegovina FA.

Management

Committee for mediation and consulting

Current head coaches

List of presidents
Since Bosnia became a member of FIFA in 1996 and until April 2011, the Football Association was headed by a three-member presidency, made up of a Bosniak, a Croat and a Serb. Due to Bosnia's unique situation and its political problems this setup was tolerated for years by both FIFA and UEFA - until transition period was over on April 1, 2011, when they suspended the association for failing to comply with FIFA statutes.

Note: Since 1996 to 2011 past FA presidency members were regularly rotated. 

N/FSBiH operates these codes:

Premier League of Bosnia and Herzegovina,
Bosnia and Herzegovina Football Cup,
Bosnia and Herzegovina Women's Football Cup,
Bosnia and Herzegovina national futsal team,
Bosnia and Herzegovina national under-15, under-17, under-19 and under-21 football team,
Bosnia and Herzegovina men's national football team,
Bosnia and Herzegovina women's national under-17 and under-19 national team,
Bosnia and Herzegovina women's national football team among other footballing matters and codes.

References

Further reading

External links

The Football Association of Bosnia and Herzegovina
Bosnia and Herzegovina at FIFA site
Bosnia and Herzegovina at UEFA site

Bosnia and Herzegovina
Association
Association
Sports governing bodies in Bosnia and Herzegovina
1920 establishments in Yugoslavia
1992 establishments in Bosnia and Herzegovina
Sports organizations established in 1920